2020–21 season was the first season of Deportivo de La Coruña in the Segunda División B, the Spanish third tier, since 1981. The club was relegated from Segunda División after two seasons in the last round, finishing in the 19th place on goal difference. The team went through a series of 6 matches without a win which greatly reduced their chances of promotion to La Liga Smartbank. Finally, the team managed to stay in the third division by one point, after it was threatened with relegation.

Players

First-team squad

Reserve team

Out on loan

Pre-season and friendlies

Competitions

Overall record

Segunda División B

First phase

Results summary

Results by round

Matches

Primera División RFEF promotion

Results by round

Copa del Rey

References 

Deportivo de La Coruña seasons
Deportivo de La Coruña